Hydes is a surname. Notable people with the surname include:

Alan Hydes (born 1947), British table tennis player
Arthur Hydes (1911–1990), British football player
Steven Hydes (born 1986), British adoptee

See also
Hodes
Hydes Brewery